Lower Fort Garry was built in 1830 by the Hudson's Bay Company on the western bank of the Red River,  north of the original Fort Garry (now in Winnipeg, Manitoba, Canada). Treaty 1 was signed there.

A devastating flood destroyed Fort Garry in 1826, prompting the Company's then-governor, George Simpson, to search for a safer location down river. Governor Simpson chose the site of Lower Fort Garry because of its high ground and location below the St. Andrew's Rapids, eliminating a time-consuming portage of heavy fur packs and York boats. However, the fort never became the administrative centre it was intended, since most of the population of the area was centred near The Forks and objected to the extra travel required to do business at the new fort. As a result, Upper Fort Garry was rebuilt in stone at The Forks, very near the original Fort Garry site.

History

Early 19th century (1830–1850)
The first buildings built at the fort in 1830 were the "fur loft", which housed the company store, small warehouse and trader's office, and the "Big House" (residence for the governor of the Hudson Bay Company (HBC) or other high-ranking officials). Later additions included a warehouse and a men's house. The fort's signature walls were completed in the 1840s, adding an icehouse, powder magazine, bakehouse, and warehouse bastions. These walls were non-military, intended only to make the fort appear more important and impressive to both local traders and visiting HBC officers. Many of the buildings were constructed with limestone, which was easily obtained from nearby. The site also hosts excellent examples of Red River Frame construction (Farm Manager's House) and Half-timbered construction (colombage pierroté) (Men's House and Big House Annex).

Although the Lower Fort did trade a small amount of furs, its main purpose was as a supply depot for the Red River settlement and the surrounding Cree, Anishinaabe, Métis, and European (mostly Orkney Scot) populations. Many furs at the fort were brought from other districts, repackaged at the fort and sent to England via York Factory. The post traded essential manufactured goods to the farmers and hunters for produce that was in turn used for provisioning company treks into the north. 

Every now and then there was a crisis that called for military action, and Lower Fort Garry was the obvious choice for a base of operations. In 1846, British troops (6th Regiment of the Foot) were sent to the fort when a dispute erupted with the United States over the boundary between the Oregon Territory and what is now British Columbia. However, some believe the request for troops was actually intended to intimidate local free traders (as trading with anyone other than the HBC was illegal). In either case, by the time the troops arrived (1846), the threat of invasion was long over. The troops (becoming a nuisance by causing minor disturbances) were put to work at the fort completing the construction of the walls which were finished in 1848.

Mid 19th century (1851–1884)
The fort became an industrial centre by the 1860s and included several buildings, such as a flour mill, sawmill, forge, and a brewery. When the Red River Rebellion broke out in 1870, Louis Riel occupied Upper Fort Garry, and the Quebec Rifles took the lower fort. No wars or fights ever occurred at Lower Fort Garry as it was a peaceful settlement.

On August 3, 1871, the first treaty in Western Canada was established between the federal government and seven chiefs of the Ojibway (Saulteaux) and Swampy Cree First Nations at Lower Fort Garry. Indian Treaty No. 1 transferred the land that now comprises part of modern Manitoba. The treaty's intent was to ensure the peaceful settlement of the prairies by European immigrants, while providing First Nations people with land, access to resources and other necessities for their survival. Almost immediately after the treaty was established, the two parties disagreed on its meaning.

Indian Treaty No. 1, the precedent for the 10 subsequent numbered treaties in Western Canada, is commemorated by a Historic Sites and Monuments Board of Canada plaque outside the Visitor Reception Centre.

Training of North-West Mounted Police members took place at the fort in the winter of 1873–1874. Many of the North-West Mounted Police of 1873–74 had been there already during the rebellion in 1870, including Inspector James F. MacLeod, who had met his fiancée, Mary Drever, at Lower Fort Garry on the previous trip. The first contingent of Mounties arrived in Lower Fort Garry on October 22, 1873, and on November 3 they were sworn in and commenced training. The bitter winter was spent drilling and learning to ride. The parade ground was frozen as hard as concrete, and was pretty unforgiving when a recruit was unexpectedly pitched from his horse. By the following June they were caught up in preparations for the arrival of Commissioner G.A. French and the other divisions, and headed out to meet them at Fort Dufferin. The fort was turned over once again to the Canadian Militia.

Recent history (1885–present)
 
The fort has also been a penitentiary, a mental hospital (1885–1886), an HBC residence, and a golf course/motor country club (1911–1963). One of the mental hospital's most infamous residents was Honoré Jaxon, Louis Riel's secretary who was found not guilty of treason by reason of insanity after the North-West Rebellion.

The HBC owned the fort until 1951, when it was given to the federal government. The site was designated a National Historic Site in 1958, and named one of the top 10 National Historic Sites in the country in 2011 by Canada's History magazine. Between May and September, costumed interpreters recreate life at Lower Fort Garry in the early 1850s when Eden Colvile was inland governor of the HBC and in residence at the fort. Original buildings and walls, hands on activities, as well as original-to-era furnishings enhance the visitor experience.

See also

 List of forts

References

External links

 Lower Fort Garry National Historic Site

Garry, Lower
Hudson's Bay Company forts
National Historic Sites in Manitoba
Living museums in Canada
History museums in Manitoba
Museums in Manitoba